Mohammed Mourhit (born 10 October 1970 in Khouribga, Morocco) is a Belgian top cross country, middle and long-distance runner who holds one European record, in the 3000 m. He is also a former European 10000 m record holder. He won a bronze medal at the 1999 World Championships in the 5000 metres and a silver medal at the 2001 IAAF World Indoor Championships in the 3000 metres behind Hicham El Guerrouj. Mourhit was also a two-time winner of the IAAF World Cross Country Championships in the long course in 2000 and 2001. He also won the Lisbon Half Marathon 1997.

He earned the Belgian citizenship in 1997 by marriage. He competed in Lotto Cross Cup cross country meetings and won the domestic series in 1996–97 and 1997–98.

He was suspended for the use of EPO in 2002. He returned to competition in 2004, after seeing his ban reduced, and qualified for the World Championships in Helsinki 2005.

He holds the fastest non-winning time for the 3000 metres. In Monaco on 18 August 2000, he ran 7:26.62, coming second to Ali Saïdi-Sief. No other man has broken 7:27 and come second.

Personal bests
 3000 m – 7:26.62 (7th all-time)
 5000 m – 12:49.71 (15th all-time)
 10000 m – 26:52.30 (32nd all-time)

See also
List of doping cases in athletics

References

Living people
1970 births
People from Khouribga
Belgian male middle-distance runners
Belgian male long-distance runners
Moroccan male middle-distance runners
Moroccan male long-distance runners
Olympic athletes of Belgium
Athletes (track and field) at the 2000 Summer Olympics
World Athletics Championships medalists
World Athletics Championships athletes for Belgium
World Athletics Cross Country Championships winners
Doping cases in athletics
Belgian sportspeople in doping cases
Moroccan sportspeople in doping cases
Belgian sportspeople of Moroccan descent
Mediterranean Games bronze medalists for Morocco
Mediterranean Games medalists in athletics
Athletes (track and field) at the 1993 Mediterranean Games